Genota is a genus of sea snails, marine gastropod mollusks in the family Borsoniidae.

Description
The shell is narrowly obconic and cancellated. The body whorl gradually tapers to a but slightly developed siphonal canal. The sinus of the lip is wide and shallow. The aperture is long and narrow with subparallel margins. The operculum is unguiculate.

Species
Species within the genus Genota include:
 † Genota maximei Ceulemans, Van Dingenen & Landau, 2018 
 Genota mitriformis (Wood W., 1828)
 Genota nicklesi Knudsen, 1952
 Genota papalis (Reeve, 1843)
 † Genota ramosa (Basterot, 1825)
 † Genota valeriae (Hoernes & Auinger, 1891) 
Species brought into synonymy
 Genota marchadi [sic] : synonym of Genota nicklesi Knudsen, 1952
 Genota marchandi Pin, 1996 : synonym of Genota nicklesi Knudsen, 1952
 Genota mitraeformis (Kiener, 1839) : synonym of Genota mitriformis (Wood W., 1828)
 Genota nigeriensis Vera-Peláez, 2004 : synonym of Genota nicklesi Knudsen, 1952
 Genota vafra Sykes, 1905 : synonym of Genota mitriformis (Wood W., 1828)

References

 Ryall P., Horro J. & Rolán E. 2013. A revision of the genus Genota H. & A. Adams, 1853 (Gastropoda: Conoidea: Borsonidae) from West Africa. Iberus, 31(2): 1-17.

External links
 Adams H. & Adams A. (1853-1858). The genera of recent Mollusca; arranged according to their organization. London, van Voorst.
  Cossmann, M. (1896). Essais de paléoconchologie comparée. Deuxième livraison. Paris, The author and Comptoir Géologique. 179 pp., 8 pls.
 
  Bouchet, P.; Kantor, Y. I.; Sysoev, A.; Puillandre, N. (2011). A new operational classification of the Conoidea. Journal of Molluscan Studies. 77, 273-308

 
Gastropod genera